Moaga is a village in the Tenkodogo Department of Boulgou Province in south-eastern Burkina Faso. In 2005, the village had a population of 397.

References

Populated places in the Centre-Est Region
Boulgou Province